Podolyans is one of Ukrainian ethnographic groups given to the people who populated the region of Podolia.

In the 19th century, Gustave Le Bon has found them to extend as far West as Tatra Mountains, named "Podolians". (probably Podhalanie).

Gallery

See also

Dnipryans
Volynians

References

External links
 Old photos of villages. Newspaper "Podolyanyn".

Slavic ethnic groups
Podolia
Ethnic groups in Ukraine
East Slavs